

August Wittmann (20 July 1895 – 29 March 1977) was a general in the Wehrmacht during World War II. He was a recipient of the Knight's Cross of the Iron Cross.

Life and career
August Wittmann was born in Munich on 20 July 1895. He entered the Bavarian Army as a volunteer shortly after the outbreak of World War I in August 1914, joining a Bavarian Field Artillery Regiment. Commissioned lieutenant in 1917, he left the army in December 1918. He then served with the Bavarian State Police until 1935. 

In October 1935 Wittmann rejoined the army and was given command of a Gebirgs (mountain) artillery battalion, rising to lead an artillery regiment three years later. In June 1941, during the battle of Crete, he was awarded the Knight's Cross of the Iron Cross for his leadership of a mountain artillery regiment. Becoming a divisional commander from February 1943, he commanded the 390th Field Training Division and then the 3rd Mountain Division on the Eastern Front, followed by the 117th Jäger Division and the 1st Mountain Division in the Balkans and Austria. He surrendered with his unit in May 1945.

Wittmann ended the war as a Generalleutnant, after promotion to this rank in April 1944.

Awards and decorations

 Mentioned in the Wehrmachtbericht (Armed Forces Report) of 11 June 1941 as Oberstleutnant and commander of Gebirgs-Artillerie-Regiment 95 (95th Mountain Artillery Regiment) during the battle of Crete. 
 Knight's Cross of the Iron Cross on 21 June 1941 as Oberstleutnant and commander of the 95th Mountain Artillery Regiment during the battle of Crete.
 German Cross in Gold on 25 August 1944 as Generalleutnant and commander of the 3 Gebirgs-Division (3rd Mountain Division) on the Eastern Front.

References

Citations

Bibliography

 

 

 

1895 births
1977 deaths
Lieutenant generals of the German Army (Wehrmacht)
Recipients of the Gold German Cross
Recipients of the Knight's Cross of the Iron Cross
Battle of Crete
German Army personnel of World War I
Military personnel from Munich
Gebirgsjäger of World War II